The Odyssey 30 is a Canadian sailboat, that was designed by George Cuthbertson of C&C Design and first built in 1987.

The design is often confused with a different boat with the same name, the Carl Alberg designed 1960 Odyssey 30.

Production

The Odyssey 30 came about after the owner of the Aloha Yachts brand and owner of the Ouyang Boat Works in Canada, Ti Ouyang, lost control of the Aloha company and formed a new company to produce the Odyssey boats. The Odyssey 30 is now out of production.

Design
The Odyssey 30 is a small recreational keelboat, built predominantly of fibreglass, with wood trim. It has a fractional sloop rig, an internally-mounted spade-type rudder and a fixed fin keel. It displaces .

See also
List of sailing boat types

Similar sailboats
Aloha 30
Catalina 30
Catalina 309
C&C 30
CS 30
J/30
Hunter 30-2
Hunter 306
Mirage 30

References

External links

Keelboats
1980s sailboat type designs
Sailing yachts
Sailboat type designs by George Cuthbertson
Sailboat types built by Ouyang Boat Works